
Gmina Lipusz is a rural gmina (administrative district) in Kościerzyna County, Pomeranian Voivodeship, in northern Poland.

The gmina contains part of the protected area called Wdydze Landscape Park.

The gmina is twinned with Madawaska Valley, Ontario, Canada.

Villages
Gmina Lipusz contains the villages and settlements of Bałachy, Gostomko, Jabłuszek Duży, Jabłuszek Mały, Krosewo, Krugliniec, Lipuska Huta, Lipusz, Papiernia, Płocice, Płocice-Kula, Śluza, Szklana Huta, Szwedzki Ostrów, Trawice, Tuszkowy and Wyrówno.

Neighbouring gminas
Gmina Lipusz is bordered by the gminas of Dziemiany, Kościerzyna, Parchowo, Studzienice and Sulęczyno.

References
Polish official population figures 2006

Lipusz
Kościerzyna County